Eurocycle is a European unicycle meeting.

The events offered vary between Eurocycles, they usually include hockey, basketball, races, muni, and artistic.

Eurocycles to date

See also
 International Unicycling Federation
 Unicon world championships 
 APUC (Asia Pacific Unicycle Championships)

Unicycling
Conventions (meetings)